= Caterina Llull i Sabastida =

Spanish businesswoman (1440–1495)

Caterina Llull i Sabastida (1440–1495) was a major Spanish businesswoman.

Caterina Llull was born in Barcelona as the daughter of Isabel de Gualbes y Pastor and Joan Llull and married to the royal official and merchant Joan Sabastida in 1460, with whom she had four children. She moved to Sicily after the wedding, where her spouse had an office in service to the crown.

When she was widowed in 1471, Caterina Llull inherited the business of her late spouse, including a grand hacienda in and an export and import company trading between Catalonia, Sicily and Crete. She defended her and her children's rights to their assets in Catalonia and Sicily before the courts in Syracuse, Palermo and the royal court. Her contacts with the royal court placed her in a good position vis a vis her business rivals. She returned with her family to Barcelona in 1482–83.
